Tennessee's 26th Senate district is one of 33 districts in the Tennessee Senate. It has been represented by Republican Page Walley since 2020, succeeding retiring fellow Republican Dolores Gresham.

Geography
District 26 covers rural West Tennessee to the east of Memphis, including all of Chester, Decatur, Fayette, Hardeman, Hardin, Haywood, Henderson, and McNairy Counties. Communities in the district include Brownsville, Lexington, Savannah, Oakland, Henderson, Bolivar, Selmer, Whiteville, Somerville, and Parsons.

The district is located largely within Tennessee's 7th congressional district, also extending into the 8th district. It overlaps with the 71st, 72nd, 80th, 82nd, and 94th districts of the Tennessee House of Representatives, and borders the states of Alabama and Mississippi. At over 4,000 square miles, it is the largest legislative district in the state.

Recent election results
Tennessee Senators are elected to staggered four-year terms, with odd-numbered districts holding elections in midterm years and even-numbered districts holding elections in presidential years.

2020

2016

2012

Federal and statewide results in District 26

References

26
Chester County, Tennessee
Decatur County, Tennessee
Fayette County, Tennessee
Hardeman County, Tennessee
Hardin County, Tennessee
Haywood County, Tennessee
Henderson County, Tennessee
McNairy County, Tennessee